

The term "molasse" refers to sandstones, shales and conglomerates that form as terrestrial or shallow marine deposits in front of rising mountain chains. The molasse deposits accumulate in a foreland basin, especially on top of flysch-like deposits, for example, those that left from the rising Alps, or erosion in the Himalaya. These deposits are typically the non-marine alluvial and fluvial sediments of lowlands, as compared to deep-water flysch sediments.  Sedimentation stops when the orogeny stops, or when the mountains have eroded flat.

The molasse can sometimes completely fill a foreland basin, creating a nearly flat depositional surface, that nonetheless remains a structural syncline.  Molasse can be very thick near the mountain front, but usually thins out towards the interior of a craton; such massive, convex accumulations of sediment are known as clastic wedges.

See also

References

Further reading
 Sinclair, H. D. (1997) "Flysch to molasse transition in peripheral foreland basins: the role of the passive margin versus slab breakoff" Geology 25(12): pp. 1123–1126, doi: 10.1130/0091-7613(1997)025<1123:FTMTIP>2.3.CO;2
 Tenchov, Yanaki G. (1989) "Demarcation of Molasse from Non-molasse sediments" Zeitschrift für geologische Wissenschaften 17(8): pp. 791–796

External links
http://www.see.leeds.ac.uk/structure/alps/map/molasse.htm Molasse, definitions and examples, simplified geological map of the western Alps. University of Leeds

Sedimentology